This is a list of the first women lawyer(s) and judge(s) in Wisconsin. It includes the year in which the women were admitted to practice law (in parentheses). Also included are women who achieved other distinctions such becoming the first in their state to graduate from law school or become a political figure.

Firsts in Wisconsin's history

Law School 

 First female law graduate: Belle Case La Follette (1885)

Lawyers 

First females: Lavinia Goodell and Elsie B. Botensek (1875)  
First African American female: Mabel Watson Raimey (1927)

State judges 

 First female (tribal judge for the Menominee): Rhoda House in 1943 
 First female: Olga Bennett (1935) in 1970 
 First African American female: Vel Phillips in 1971 
 First female (Chief Judge; First Judicial District): Kitty K. Brennan (1977) 
 First female (Wisconsin Supreme Court): Shirley Abrahamson (1962) in 1976 
First openly lesbian female: Shelley Gaylord in 1993 
First female (Chief Justice; Wisconsin Supreme Court): Shirley Abrahamson (1962) in 1996  
 First Hmong American (female): Kashoua Kristy Yang (2009) in 2017
 First African American female elected without being appointed by a governor: Danielle L. Shelton in 2019

Attorney General of Wisconsin 

 First female: Peg Lautenschlager (1980) from 2003-2007

United States Attorney 

 First female (U.S. Attorney for the Western District of Wisconsin): Peg Lautenschlager (1980) from 1993-2001

District Attorney 

First female: Dorothy Walker (c. 1922)

Political Office 

First openly lesbian female (U.S. Senate): Tammy Baldwin (1989) in 2012

State Bar of Wisconsin 

 First female (president): Pamela Barker 
First African American (female): Michelle Behnke in 2004

Firsts in local history
 Rose Patricia Ryan (1928): First female lawyer in Appleton, Wisconsin [Calumet, Outagamie, and Winnebago Counties, Wisconsin]
 Katherine Williams: First female to earn a law degree from Marquette University in Milwaukee, Wisconsin (1909)
 Elizabeth Hawkes (1937): First female Washburn High School graduate to become a lawyer [Bayfield County, Wisconsin]
 Vivi L. Dilweg: First female judge in Brown County, Wisconsin
 Moria Krueger: First female judge in Dane County, Wisconsin
 Lisa K. Stark: First female judge in Eau Claire County, Wisconsin (2000)
 Anna Becker (1993): First female judge in Jackson County, Wisconsin (1982)
 Razy Geraldine Kletecka Chojnacki (1943): First female lawyer in La Crosse County, Wisconsin
 Kate Kane Rossi (1877): First female lawyer in Milwaukee, Wisconsin [Milwaukee County, Wisconsin]
Julia B. Lebowitz Dolan (1927): Admitted to the practice of law, 1927. Female lawyer in Milwaukee, Wisconsin
Mabel Watson Raimey (1927): First African American female lawyer in Milwaukee, Wisconsin [Milwaukee County, Wisconsin]
Vel Phillips: First female judge (and African American female) in Milwaukee County, Wisconsin
Kitty K. Brennan (1977): First female to become Chief Judge of the First Judicial District in Milwaukee County, Wisconsin
Kashoua "Kristy" Yang (2009): First Hmong American female judge in Milwaukee County, Wisconsin (2017)
Maxine White: First African American female to serve as the Chief Judge for Milwaukee County, Wisconsin (2019)
Mary Roth Burns: First female judge in Oneida County, Wisconsin (2022)
Nancy Krueger (1979): First female judge in Outagamie County, Wisconsin (2007)
Sandy A. Williams: First female judge in Ozaukee County, Wisconsin (2009). She also served as the first female District Attorney for Ozaukee County.
Patricia Baker: First female judge in Portage County, Wisconsin (2020)
Nettie Elizabeth Karcher (1915): First female lawyer in Racine County, Wisconsin
Sheila Mildred Parrish-Spence: First African-American female to serve as an Assistant District Attorney in Racine County, Wisconsin (1980)
Barbara McCrory: First female judge in Rock County, Wisconsin (2012)
Virginia A. Wolfe: First female judge in Sauk County, Wisconsin (1988)
Edith Arelisle Zufelt (1901): First female to register with the Sheboygan County Bar Association [Sheboygan County, Wisconsin]

 Olga Bennett (c. 1956): First female lawyer in Vernon County, Wisconsin

 Annette Ziegler: First female judge in Washington County, Wisconsin (1997)
 Peg Lautenschlager (1980): First female to serve as District Attorney for Winnebago County, Wisconsin (1985-1988)

See also  

 List of first women lawyers and judges in the United States
 Timeline of women lawyers in the United States
 Women in law

Other topics of interest 

 List of first minority male lawyers and judges in the United States
 List of first minority male lawyers and judges in Wisconsin

References 

Lawyers, Wisconsin
First, Wisconsin
First, Wisconsin
Women, Wisconsin, first
Women, Wisconsin, first
Women in Wisconsin
Lawyers, women
History of women in Wisconsin
Wisconsin law